Javrail Shapiev (born 20 April 1997) is an Uzbek wrestler. He is competing in the 2020 Summer Olympics.

References

External links
 

Living people
1997 births
Wrestlers at the 2020 Summer Olympics
Olympic wrestlers of Uzbekistan
Uzbekistani male sport wrestlers